Sacrario militare di Pocol (also known as Ossario di Pocol) is a cemetery and shrine near the Falzarego Pass, in the locality of Pocol in the comune of Cortina d'Ampezzo in the Veneto region of northern Italy. The small church and cemetery were built in 1916 as a military cemetery by the 5th Alpine group. A shrine was built in 1935 as memorial to the thousands who died during World War I on the Dolomite front. It is a massive square tower of stone, clearly visible from the entire Ampezzo valley below. The remains of 9,707 Italian soldiers (4,455 of them unknown) and 37 Austro-Hungarian soldiers are buried in the shrine. In a crypt in the centre of the structure rests the body of general Antonio Cantore, who was awarded the gold medal for military valor.

References

External links
 
 

Buildings and structures in Cortina d'Ampezzo
Monuments and memorials in Veneto
Cemeteries in Italy
Buildings and structures completed in 1935
1935 establishments in Italy